Egmont is a former New Zealand electorate, in south Taranaki. It existed from 1871 to 1978.

Geographic coverage
Egmont is the old name of the mountain that is the Taranaki landmark of Mount Taranaki. A village north of the mountain is also called Egmont.

History
This rural electorate was formed in 1871. Mount Egmont, after which it is named, was confiscated from Māori by the New Zealand Government under the powers of the New Zealand Settlements Act 1863, following the Second Taranaki War.

William Gisborne was the first elected representative in 1871, elected unopposed. He was a minister in the third Fox Ministry and resigned from Parliament when the government fell on 10 September 1872. Harry Atkinson won the resulting 1872 by-election. He held the electorate until 1891, when he resigned. During this time, he was Premier on four occasions.

Atkinson's resignation caused the 1891 by-election, which was won by Felix McGuire. He held the electorate until 1896, when he (successfully) stood for the Hawera electorate instead. He was succeeded by Walter Symes from 1896 until 1902, when he (successfully) stood for Patea. The next representative was William Thomas Jennings from 1902 until 1908, when he (successfully) stood for Taumarunui.

Bradshaw Dive was elected in 1908 and held the electorate for one term. He was defeated in 1911 by Thomas Mackenzie, who resigned in 1912. Charles Wilkinson won the resulting 1912 by-election and retired in 1919. He was succeeded by Oswald Hawken, who won the 1919 election, but was defeated in 1928 by Wilkinson coming out of his retirement. This time, Wilkinson held the electorate until 1943, when he retired for good.

The electorate was then held by three members of the National Party; Ernest Corbett (1943–57), William Sheat (1957–66) and Venn Young (1966–78).

Egmont was abolished in 1978, and was replaced by the Waitotara electorate.

Members of Parliament
Egmont was represented by twelve Members of Parliament:

Key

Election results

1931 election

1928 election

1912 by-election

1905 election

1899 election

1893 election

1891 by-election

1890 election

Notes

References

Historical electorates of New Zealand
Politics of Taranaki
1870 establishments in New Zealand
1978 disestablishments in New Zealand